Danica Nana Guberinič (born 15 June 1955) is former a Yugoslav and Slovenian female professional basketball player.

External links
Profile at fibaeurope.com

1955 births
Living people
People from Domžale
Slovenian women's basketball players
Yugoslav women's basketball players